Leonard James Beecher  (21 May 190616 December 1987) was an English-born Anglican archbishop. He was the first archbishop of the Province of East Africa, comprising Kenya and Tanzania, from 1960 to 1970.

Education and training
He was educated at St Olave's Grammar School and Imperial College London and ordained in 1929.

Missionary in Africa
He was a missionary of the Church Mission Society in the Diocese of Mombasa from 1930, working in the Highlands. He was appointed Archdeacon of Mombasa and a Canon (both 1945–1953) and an Assistant Bishop of Mombasa: he was consecrated a bishop on St James's Day 1950 (25 July) by Geoffrey Fisher, Archbishop of Canterbury, at St Paul's Cathedral. He became diocesan Bishop of Mombasa in 1953 and — additionally — Archbishop of the Province of East Africa, from 1960 to 1970: he was elected (by the House of Bishops of the province-to-be) to serve as the first archbishop in April 1960 and installed by Geoffrey Fisher, Archbishop of Canterbury, at the new province's inauguration service on 3 August 1960 at Dar-es-Salaam.

Later life
A prominent member of the Royal African Society, he retired in 1970 and died on 16 December 1987. He is buried in the cemetery at All Saints, Limuru.

References

1906 births
1987 deaths
20th-century Anglican archbishops
Alumni of Imperial College London
Anglican archbishops of East Africa
Archdeacons of Mombasa
Associates of the Royal College of Science
Anglican bishops of Mombasa
Companions of the Order of St Michael and St George
English Anglicans
Holders of a Lambeth degree
People educated at St Olave's Grammar School
Anglican bishops of Nairobi